Marlies Bänziger (born 14 March 1960) is a Swiss politician of the Green Party of Switzerland.

Political career 
Marlies Bänziger joined the Green Party of Switzerland in the 1980s. In May 1990 she was elected to the municipal parliament (Gemeinderat) of Winterthur. From 2000 to 2005 Bänziger represented the municipality of Winterthur as a member of the cantonal parliament. From June 2004 to January 2008 she was co-president, in co-operation with Balthasar Glättli, and president of the Green Party of the canton of Zürich by November 2009. Bänziger was elected to the National Council (Nationalrat) in the Swiss federal election in October 2007, but the following legislature she failed the majority of votes by just 103 votes in October 2011.

Mandatory work 
From 1997 to 2009 she was elected as a councillor (Bezirksrätin) of the district of Winterthur. Among the parliament commissions, Bänziger was member of the finance committee of the Swiss upper and lower parliament houses, and a member of the Swiss EFTA delegation. As constitutional councilor, in 2000 Bänziger became actively involved in the drafting of the new constitution of the Canton of Zürich, which was approved by the voters in 2005. In November 2008 Bänziger was elected president of the Swiss air emissions association (SSF), and in September 2009 she became president of Fussverkehr Schweiz, a pedestrian organisation.

Personal life 
Born in Winterthur, Marlies Bänziger raised in Oberembrach and in Winterthur; she has the citizenship (Heimatort) of Heiden AR and Schüpfen by marriage. Bänziger acquired Maturität and the patent as primary school teacher (Primarlehrer) at the Gymnasium in Winterthur, and worked for a short time as flight attendant. She's a single mother of a daughter and a son.

References

External links 

 Marlies Bänziger on facebook 
 

1960 births
Living people
Green Party of Switzerland politicians
Members of the National Council (Switzerland)
People from Winterthur
Swiss schoolteachers
Swiss women educators
Swiss educators
Women members of the National Council (Switzerland)
20th-century Swiss women politicians
20th-century Swiss politicians
21st-century Swiss women politicians
21st-century Swiss politicians
21st-century Swiss educators
20th-century Swiss educators
Flight attendants
20th-century women educators
21st-century women educators